The Breda–Rotterdam railway is a heavily used railway line in the Netherlands running from Breda to Rotterdam, passing through Dordrecht. It is also called the Staatslijn I ("state line I") in Dutch. The line was opened between 1866 and 1877.

The railway was opened in phases:

 1 July 1866:  -  - 
 1 January 1872: Lage Zwaluwe - Dordrecht, including the Moerdijk Bridge
 1 November 1872:  - Rotterdam Mallegat
 1 May 1877: Rotterdam Mallegat - 
 2 December 1878: Rotterdam Mallegat - Rotterdam Feijenoord (goods transport only)

Until 1872, transport between Moerdijk and Rotterdam was by ferry.

The railway was electrified in 1950.

The railway viaducts and the old  over the Nieuwe Maas were subsequently demolished, leaving only the lifting bridge De Hef over the Koningshaven which has been preserved as an industrial heritage site.

Stations
The main interchange stations on the Breda–Rotterdam railway are:

Breda: to Tilburg, Nijmegen, Roosendaal and Eindhoven
Dordrecht: to Roosendaal and Gorinchem
Rotterdam Centraal: to The Hague, Utrecht and Amsterdam

Railway lines in the Netherlands
Railway lines in North Brabant
Transport in Breda
Transport in Dordrecht
Rail transport in Rotterdam
Regional rail in the Netherlands